FAST is an acronym used as a mnemonic to help detect and enhance responsiveness to the needs of a person having a stroke. The acronym stands for Facial drooping, Arm weakness, Speech difficulties and Time to call emergency services.
F - Facial drooping - A section of the face, usually only on one side, that is drooping and hard to move. This can be recognized by a crooked smile.
A - Arm weakness - The inability to raise one's arm fully, or the inability to hold something or squeeze i.e. someone's hand.
S - Speech difficulties - An inability or difficulty to understand or produce speech, slurred speech or having difficulty repeating even a basic sentence such as "The sky is blue".
T - Time - If any of the symptoms above are showing, time is of the essence; call the emergency services and go to the hospital immediately. It is also important to check the time so that you'll know when the first symptoms appeared (time is brain)

History
The FAST acronym was developed in the UK in 1998 by a group of stroke physicians, ambulance personnel, and an emergency department physician and was designed to be an integral part of a training package for ambulance staff. The acronym was created to expedite administration of intravenous tissue plasminogen activator to patients within 3 hours of acute stroke symptom onset. The instruments at this time with most evidence of validity were the Cincinnati Prehospital Stroke Scale (CPSS) and the Los Angeles Prehospital Stroke Screen (LAPSS).

Studies using FAST have demonstrated variable diagnostic accuracy of strokes by paramedics and emergency medical technicians with positive predictive values between 64% and 77%.

Other acronyms such as BE-FAST has shown promise by capturing >95% of ischemic strokes, however adding coordination and diplopia assessment did not improve stroke detection in the prehospital setting.

Alternative versions
BE-FAST has shown promise and is currently being studied as an alternative method to the FAST acronym.

 B - Balance
 E - Eyes
 F - Face
 A - Arm
 S - Speech
 T - Time

NEWFAST (c) is an additional stroke identification tool available for use. 
Copyrighted by Deborah Stabell Tran in 2017, (and created in 2016) as part of a DNP project, it was created to identify all types of strokes - anterior or posterior ischemic, and hemorrhagic strokes. It gives more definition to testing dizziness and balance, hallmark signs of posterior strokes. NEWFAST also addresses the sudden onset of a severe headache and vomiting that often accompany bleeds in the head. 
NEW - means a NEW onset of symptoms (generally within the past 24 hours, but a sudden onset in general).
N - Nausea/Vomiting - sudden onset
E - Eyes - Double vision, field cut, neglect (can't see or notice what is going on, on one side of the body), and/or nystagmus(eyes involuntarily shifting back and forth)
W - Walking - If you suddenly can not walk due to dizziness, or your try to walk and you shift to one side.
F - Facial droop - one side of the face is droopy
A - Arm Weakness - especially one side being weak
S - Speech - slurred, confused, and/or absent speech
T - Terrible Headache/Dizziness (often described as thunderclap headache or dizziness regardless of position of body - sitting, standing, or laying down)
FASTER is used by Beaumont Health.

 F - Face - Facial drooping or numbness on one side of the face 
 A - Arms - Arm weakness on one side of the body
 S - Stability - Inability to maintain balance and stay steady on one's feet; dizziness
 T - Talking - Slurred speech, inability to respond coherently, or other speech difficulty
 E - Eyes - Changes in vision, including seeing double, or partial or complete blindness in one or both eyes
 R - React - Call emergency services immediately if you see any of these symptoms, even if symptoms go away

References

Stroke
Medical diagnosis
Medical mnemonics
Mnemonic acronyms